Songs of Love and Death: All-Original Tales of Star-Crossed Love is a cross-genre anthology featuring 17 original short stories of romance in science fiction/fantasy settings, edited by George R. R. Martin and Gardner Dozois and released on November 16, 2010. Suzanne Johnson wrote for Tor.com, "From zombie-infested woods in a postapocalyptic America to faery-haunted rural fields in eighteenth-century England, from the kingdoms of high fantasy to the alien world of a galaxy-spanning empire, these are stories of lovers who must struggle against the forces of magic and fate."

Contents
 “Love Hurts” by Jim Butcher (The Dresden Files)
 “The Marrying Maid” by Jo Beverley
 “Rooftops” by Carrie Vaughn
 “Hurt Me” by M.L.N. Hanover
 “Demon Lover” by Cecelia Holland
 “The Wayfarer’s Advice” by Melinda M. Snodgrass (Imperials)
 “Blue Boots” by Robin Hobb
 “The Thing About Cassandra” by Neil Gaiman
 “After the Blood” by Marjorie M. Liu
 “You and You Alone” by Jacqueline Carey (Kushiel's Legacy)
 “His Wolf” by Lisa Tuttle
 “Courting Trouble” by Linnea Sinclair
 “The Demon Dancer” by Mary Jo Putney
 “Under/Above the Water” by Tanith Lee
 “Kashkia” by Peter S. Beagle
 “Man in the Mirror” by Yasmine Galenorn
 “A Leaf on the Wind of All Hallows” by Diana Gabaldon (Outlander)

References

2010 anthologies
Gardner Dozois anthologies
2010s science fiction works
Gallery Books books